St. Clare's Hospital may refer to:
 St. Clare's Hospital (Manhattan), New York, 1934–2007
 St. Clare Medical Center, the 1999–2010 name of Franciscan Health Crawfordsville, Indiana